Jalan Sungai Menyala (Negeri Sembilan state route N8) is a major road in Negeri Sembilan, Malaysia. There are many Malaysian Army camps along this road. The Malaysian Army Museum is located along this road.

List of junctions

Roads in Negeri Sembilan